P. A. Periyanayaki (14 April 1927 – 1990) was an Indian playback singer and actress who worked mainly in Tamil-language films. She also performed stage concerts as a Carnatic singer.

Early life 
She hails from Thiruvadhigai near Panruti. Her mother Adhilakshmi was a singer and was fondly called "Panruti Ammal"
Periyanayaki is the youngest of Adhilakshmi's 3 children. Others are Balasubramanian and Rajamani.
Adhilakshmi went to Sri Lanka with her 3 children and was performing music concerts there. When her health deteriorated, she returned to India with her children and settled in Chennai.

Periyanayaki studied up to 7th Standard in the C. S. M. School at Thiruvallikeni.

Film career 
In 1940, Periyanayaki's sister P. A. Rajamani got a chance to act in a Tamil film Urvashiyin Kadhal. P. A. Periyanayaki also got the chance to act and sing in that film as a heavenly maiden. So she had to leave the school and had to go to Salem with her mother.

Periyanayaki trained in Carnatic music from her mother and from Pathamadai Sundara Iyer. She performed stage concerts.

She had a captivating voice and singing talent. Therefore, she was able to enter the Tamil Cinema.

In 1941 AVM produced a full-length comedy film Sabapathy. Periyanayaki performs a stage Carnatic music concert as a scene in the film. Apart from that, she sang 2 songs in this film.

She featured in Dharma Veeran (1941), En Manaivi (1942), Manonmani (1942), Panchamirtham (1942), Prabhavathi (1942), Sivalinga Satchi (1942), Mahamaya (1944), Vichitra Vanitha (1947), Vedhala Ulagam (1948), Geetha Gandhi (1949), Krishna Bakthi (1949) and Koondukili (1954).

She lent voice to heroine Rukmini in Sri Valli in 1945 for the first time as a playback singer. She sang all the songs overnight and the technicians had to work round the clock to get them ready for the film.

She featured as Narada in Rukmangadhan and as Satyabhama in Krishna Bakthi.

She featured as the heroine in Ekambavanan (1947).

Some of her songs 
 Thiruvadi Malarale – Raga: Desh, Film: Prabhavathi
 Thirumaadhu Valar Ponnaadu, Vellimalaikedhiraai Vilangum Ezhumalaiyaan – Film: Prabhavathi
 Yen Manam Kavarndha – Film: Lavanya (1951) Music: S. V. Venkatraman
 Jeeviya Bhagyame, Vettunda Kaigal, Kanniye Maamari Thaaye, Arul Thaarum Deva Mathaave – Film: Gnana Soundari (1948), Music: S. V. Venkatraman
 Chinthai Arindhu Vaadi – Film: Sri Valli, Lyricist: Papanasam Sivan, Music: R. Sudarsanam
 Neeli Magan Nee Allavo – Raga: Karaharapriya, Film: Malaikkallan
 Jeeva Oliyaaga – Film: Paithiyakaran, (playback for T. A. Mathuram)

Filmography

As Singer/Actress

As Playback singer

References

External links 
Songs by P. A. Periyanayaki

Songs in her very first film Urvashiyin Kadhal

1927 births
1990 deaths
Carnatic singers
Actresses in Tamil cinema
Indian women playback singers
Tamil playback singers
Indian women classical singers
20th-century Indian actresses
20th-century Indian singers
People from Cuddalore district
Tamil actresses
Singers from Tamil Nadu
Actresses from Tamil Nadu
20th-century Indian women singers
Women musicians from Tamil Nadu
Actresses in Malayalam cinema
Actresses in Telugu cinema